Goodenia ovata, commonly called the hop goodenia, is a species of flowering plant and is endemic to south-eastern Australia. It is a shrub with sticky, often varnished foliage, toothed egg-shaped to elliptic leaves and racemes or thyrses of yellow flowers.

Description

Taxonomy
Goodenia ovata was first formally described in 1794 by James Edward Smith in Transactions of the Linnean Society of London from specimens "presented to the Society by Mr. Hoy" in December 1792. The species' name ovata refers to the egg-shaped or oval leaves.

Distribution and habitat
Hop goodenia grows in forest, woodland and scrub in higher rainfall areas, and especially in disturbed areas. It is found near the coast as well as in drier inland areas. It occurs in south-eastern South Australia, most of Victoria apart from the northern mallee and alpine areas and most of New South Wales. It is also widespread in Tasmania and south-eastern Queensland. It grows on medium-nutrient clay soils derived from shale, as well as siltstone and sandstone, in areas of good drainage in a partly-shaded location in moist eucalypt forests alongside Themeda australis and under such trees as turpentine (Syncarpia glomulifera)  or blackbutt (Eucalyptus pilularis), or in open forest under swamp oak (Casuarina glauca), forest red gum (Eucalyptus tereticornis), thin-leaved stringybark (E. eugenioides), or woollybutt (E. longifolia).

Ecology
The flowers of G. ovata are pollinated by insects, including native bees, honeybees, and hoverflies. The plant is killed by bushfire and regenerates from seed afterwards.

Use in horticulture
In cultivation, the species prefers a situation in part shade and with some moisture. It copes with a range of soil types and tolerates moderate frost. Fast-growing, it can be used as a "filler" plant in the garden. It is readily propagated by cuttings.

References

ovata
Flora of New South Wales
Flora of Queensland
Flora of South Australia
Flora of Tasmania
Flora of Victoria (Australia)
Asterales of Australia
Taxa named by James Edward Smith
Plants described in 1794